Neva is a Russian monthly literary magazine, founded in the Soviet era.

History
The magazine was first published in St. Petersburg in April 1955. It was founded on the basis of yield up to being the "Leningrad almanac" as the official organ of the Leningrad writers' organizations.

In Soviet times, the magazine published works by Mikhail Zoshchenko, Mikhail Sholokhov, Veniamin Kaverin, Lydia Chukovskaya, Lev Gumilyov, Dmitry Likhachov, Aleksandr Solzhenitsyn, Daniil Granin, Fyodor Abramov, Viktor Konetskiy, Arkady and Boris Strugatsky, Vladimir Dudintsev, Vasil Bykaŭ, and others.

In addition to prose, poetry, journalism, and literary criticism, the magazine also printed translations from the literature of the socialist countries, as well as (since 1981) under the heading "Seventh Notebook" - a group of short essays on the history of St. Petersburg and the surrounding areas.

Until 1989, the cover of the magazine featured views of St. Petersburg – drawings and photographs. Since 1989, these have published on the first inside page.

Circulation 
1958 - 75,000 copies. 
1963-200 000 copies.
1973-260 000 copies.
1986-290 000 copies.
1989-660 000-675 000 copies.
1990-615 000-640 000 copies.
1993 - 58 000 copies.
1994 - 26,640 copies.

Authors
In the 2000s, their journalists include Eugene Alekhin, Gorbovsky Gleb, Alexander Karasyov, Alexander Kushner, Nikolay Blagodatov, Vladimir Lorchenkov, Sergei Pereslegin, Yuri Polyakov, Yevgeni Anatolyevich Popov, Galina Talanov, Igor Nikolayevich, Vladislav Kurash and others.

References

1955 establishments in the Soviet Union
Magazines established in 1955
Magazines published in Saint Petersburg
Russian-language magazines
Literary magazines published in Russia
Monthly magazines published in Russia
Magazines published in the Soviet Union